Environmental policy of the Bush administration may refer to:

George H. W. Bush
 Presidency of George H. W. Bush#Environment
 Environmental policy of the United States#The George H. W. Bush Administration (1989–1993)

George W. Bush
 Presidency of George W. Bush#Environmental policies
 George W. Bush#Environmental policies
 Domestic policy of the George W. Bush administration#Environment
 Environmental policy of the United States#The George W. Bush Administration (2001–2009)